The Marxism of Che Guevara: Philosophy, Economics, and Revolutionary Warfare is a 1970 book by Michael Löwy.  It is a short work addressing the political, ethical and economic components of Ernesto Guevara's thinking.

The English translation by Brian Pearce was published by Monthly Review Press in 1973.

Response
Encyclopædia Britannica described it as "a short but lucid introduction to Guevara's ideas".

References

External links
 Facebook Page
 Front and Back Cover of Book

1973 non-fiction books
Books about Marxism
Books about Che Guevara
French non-fiction books